The Last Encore is the fourth album by the Dutch progressive rock band Kayak. It was originally released by Mercury Records in 1976 and issued on CD in 1995, with a re-release by Universal in 2002.

The songs "Still My Heart Cries For You" and "Do You Care" were released as singles in The Netherlands but neither charted in the Top 40. After this album, drummer and founder member Pim Koopman left the band to become a record producer. He returned to Kayak in 1999.

Track listing 
 "Back To The Front" (Scherpenzeel/Slager) - 4:30
 "Nothingness" (Scherpenzeel) - 3:56
 "Love Of A Victim" (Koopman) - 2:49
 "Land On The Water" (Koopman) - 2:27
 "The Last Encore" (Scherpenzeel) - 3:59
 "Do You Care" (Koopman) - 2:48
 "Still My Heart Cries For You" (Koopman) - 4:32
 "Relics From A Distant Age" (Scherpenzeel) - 4:54
 "Love Me Tonight / Get On Board" (Scherpenzeel) - 2:40
 "Evocation" (Koopman) - 3:49
 "Raid Your Own House" (Scherpenzeel) - 3:35
 "Well Done" (Koopman) - 0:53

The original LP was not released in the USA. Instead, Janus Records released an LP with songs from 2 European Kayak releases. The USA LP Starlight Dancer contains songs from the European "The Last Encore" and "Starlight Dancer" albums. It has the sleeve design of "The Last Encore".

Lineup
 Max Werner - lead (all but 12) vocals, percussion, Mellotron
 Johan Slager - guitars, backing vocals
 Ton Scherpenzeel - keyboards, backing vocals, accordion, double bass
 Bert Veldkamp - bass, backing vocals, double bass, saxophone, zither
 Pim Koopman - drums, backing and lead (12) vocals percussion, marimba, piano

References

External links
Official homepage

Kayak (band) albums
1976 albums